The Benyovszky of Benyó and Urbanó family was a noble family in the Kingdom of Hungary.
 The hereditary title count was granted to Maurice Benyovszky in 1776 and to Emanuel Benyovszky in 1791.

See also
List of titled noble families in the Kingdom of Hungary

References

Sources

External links

Hungarian nobility